Amal Hijazi (born 20 February 1977) is a Lebanese singer and actress. Hijazi released her debut album, Akher Gharam, in 2001, followed by her second album, Zaman in mid-2002. The latter included four number one hit singles, "Zaman", "Oulhali", "Einak" and "Romansyia". Her third album Bedawwar A Albi was released in early 2004 followed by the release of her fourth album Baya al Ward in 2006. The album's opening song of the same name caused some negative publicity and controversy.

Hijazi remained at the forefront of pop music with the release of her Gulf single "Nefsy Tefhamny" in 2007. She released her fifth studio album, Keef el Amar, in 2008.

Early life
Amal Hijazi was born in Beirut, to a family originally from Kfarfila. She has five siblings, her father died when she was ten years old. She lived in France for ten years during the Lebanese Civil War. She studied Architecture and graduated in 2001.

Career

2000–2003: Rise to fame
Her first single Halan ("Right Away") was released in 2000 and acted as a catalyst for Hijazi to establish herself as a major female artist in Lebanon. The single was well received in Lebanon and gained generally positive reviews in countries like Egypt and Jordan. In addition, it received moderate radio airplay in the rest of the Middle East. Surprised by the success of "Halan", Hijazi's managers asked her to record another. Hijazi's second single Rayyah Balak ("Put Your Mind at Ease") was released a year later, for which she also shot a music video. Rayyah Balak was a surprising success. The single was charted strongly around the Middle East and the music video gained extremely positive reviews from both critics and fans.

On the same year her debut album Akher Gharam was released followed the lead single of the same name. The album was produced by Dilara Master Production and distributed by Music Master. Hijazi made history in 2001, when her album became the highest selling debut album ever released by a female artist. It was ranked as the eighth highest selling Arabic album of 2001 by Chart Magazine. Akher Gharam released three hit singles, "Akher Gharam", "Habibi Oud" and "Ghanniet" which helped her to stay at the number one spot for more than six months. In addition, Hijazi broke the record of having all her four singles debut at number one in countries like Lebanon, Egypt, Syria, Morocco and Tunisia.
Akher Gharam was also a considerable success outside the Middle East especially in Malaysia, which led her to perform at the Malaysian Popular Star Award in October 2002.
Riding a wave of publicity and hype, Hijazi released her second studio album, Zaman (Long Ago). Preceded by the single of the same name, the album proved to be an instant bestseller. It debuted at number one in a number of countries like Lebanon, Egypt, Syria, Morocco and UAE. Concerning both musical content and lyrics, the album was very similar to Hijazi's debut, although it fared better with critics. According to Hijazi's production company Dilara Master Production, the album has in fact surpassed expectations in the number of breaking figures in the music market all over the world, despite of the heavy competition Hijazi had had with a number of other Arabic female singers like Elissa.

The title track, "Zaman" went on top become one of the biggest hits ever in the Middle East and to date is still considered to be Hijazi's signature song. Another single "Romansiya" was also a big hit for Hijazi, continuing the streak of hit singles off of her second album. The music video for "Romancia" was one of the most popular of 2003 under the direction of Mirna Khayat.
By the end of the year it was announced that Zaman was one of the highest selling albums ever released by a female artist. It was also in fact the album's huge success that made Hijazi sign her multimillion-dollar promotional deal with Panasonic.

Due to the album's noted achievement, Hijazi was personally invited by the Jordan River Foundation to hold a special concert under the patronage of Queen Rania Al-Abdullah.

2006–2008: Baya al Ward and Keef el Amar
After an absence that lasted for more than two years, Hijazi released her fourth, studio album, Baya al Ward in 2006. The album generated extremely negative reviews due to its bold lyrical content and unusual artwork. Hijazi had returned with an extremely sophisticated look that generally attracted negative publicity and controversies where she appeared with short, pixie blond hair and clothes that "promoted homosexuality and lesbianism" according to critics.

The music video of Baya al Ward heavily criticized and caused huge controversies that Hijazi was promoting homosexuality. Hijazi denied the allegations, however critics argued that the T-shirt she was wearing in the music video had several symbols imprinted on it which belonged to a garment manufacturer, specialising in clothing for homosexuals. At a press conference she held in Dubai to announce the launch of her album, Hijazi clarified that she did not know what the symbols on the shirt meant or that she never thought to find out when she chose to wear it. Critics argued that Hijazi had gone to extremes and cut her hair shorter than that of an ordinary woman. The video was accused of being unorthodox because Hijazi cuts her hair off and drowns herself at the end out of depression over the man who left her. Despite the heavy controversy behind the video, the album Baya al Ward managed to sell in huge numbers all around the Middle East and beyond and generated two hit singles.

In 2007, Hijazi released a new single, "Nefsy Tefhamny" which was a traditional and modern Khaleeji song that brought a new style to the singer. In 2008, Hijazi's released her fifth album Keef el Amar, which includes the single "Nefsy Tefhamny".

"Ahla Mafe el Ayyam" was the first single from Keek el Amar.

2009–2017: Waylak Min Allah and Fen el Dameer
The album's second single "Albi Nadak" was released in 2009, a year later. Hijazi has stated that she has dedicated the song to motherhood and appears in the clip as a pregnant woman, the video was directed by Salem al Turk. The video reached No. 4 on the Rotana Top 10.

Amal Hijazi came out with the new album Waylak Min Allah, with a single from it released with the same title. The single has reached No. 1 in Lebanon and the story line of the video related to her husband betraying her love and also the country. The words mainly deal with his betrayal of her love and the time they spent together in the past, and reminiscence about time lost. At the end of 2011, Amal filmed a new video clip for her song "Ba'ayounak Za'al" followed by another video clip for the song "Be a'melni" early on 2012.

As the Arab revolutions began and the violation of human rights increased, Amal released her single "Fen el Dameer" "Where is the Conscience" in April 2013. The song lyrics dealt immediately with situation of the Arab World.

Hijazi filed a lawsuit against the music production company, Rotana, following their failure to stick to the terms and conditions of their contract.

2017–present: Religious music
In September 2017, Hijazi announced that she quit singing and would perform only religious music.

Personal life
Hijazi married Mohammed al-Bassam in 2008, they both have two children, Karim and Lareen.

Controversies

Relationships with other singers

Elissa
Other than the heavy controversies behind her latest album, Hijazi has also been accused of imitating the popular Lebanese singer Elissa, especially in the video of Hijazi's hit song, "Bedawwar A Albi" ("Searching for my heart"). Hijazi however denied the accusations stressing that each of the singers has her own unique style. Hijazi added that her song was filmed long before Elissa's "Hubbak Waja" and had been airing on different satellite channels sometime in 2004.

Unlike the rumors, Hijazi stressed that she is not enemies with Elissa, stating, "We are merely two people who do not mix with one another, and if we by chance meet we just say 'hello.'" Hijazi also stated that she does not compete with any specific singer, but rather is inspired by the success of others and strives to always do her best.

In 2004, however, Hijazi put everything aside and made a personal visit Elissa to give her condolences after the latter lost her father to cancer. Elissa welcomed Amal with open arms and expressed her gratitude towards Amal's attempt to stand by her side at such a troublesome time.

Nancy Ajram
There were rumors of Hijazi criticising Nancy Ajram of singing on stage while pregnant. Hijazi has however denied the allegations stating, "All what I said is that I don’t find it fit for a pregnant singer to perform on stage. I didn’t hit on Nancy at all."

Nawal Al Zoghbi
Recently, Hijazi has accused Nawal Al Zoghbi for stealing her contract of the Kuwaiti optical company Fashion Look. Hijazi added that al Zoghbi stole the commercial and took it for herself, by asking one of her business managers to call the contact company owner and asked him to have Nawal make the advertisement for less money instead of Hijazi. 
Hijazi stated that she had seen the contract that al Zoghbi signed with the company and found out that al Zoghbi was paid less than the offer they had given her.

Banning in Kuwait
In April, Hijazi expressed her shock at being banned from entering Kuwait despite her continuous efforts to travel there. The singer had submitted numerous requests to obtain a visa for both holding concerts for her Kuwaiti fans and for leisure, but all attempts were rejected.

The singer stated that she was told that Kuwaiti officials had ordered for her ban without giving her any justifications. Hijazi noted that she will not let the matter be until she is able to find out the real reasons behind her ban.

Image and fashion
In 2002, after the release of her album Zaman rumours arose that Hijazi was involved in a number of cosmetic surgeries due to her new look. Hijazi however denied the statements saying that she only had one plastic surgery and that was rhinoplasty. She added, "I refuse to insert silicon or any other thing into my body, and greatly fear the negative side effects too many plastic surgeries may have."

In 2005, Hijazi was especially chosen by the well-known Lebanese designer Joe Raed as the model for his new line of wedding dresses to be released this summer season. Ra'ed revealed that he chose Amal for her good natured qualities and her beauty.

Hijazi was named 8th Arab Sexiest Woman Alive in 2008, ahead of artists like Elissa, Nancy Ajram and Najwa Karam. In addition, Hijazi managed to receive twice as many votes as the Egyptian singer Sherine.

Discography

Albums
 Akher Gharam (2001), Dilara Master Production
 Zaman (2002), Dilara Master Production
 Bedawwar A Albi (2004), Rotana Records
 Baya al Ward (2006), Rotana Records
 Keef el Amar (2008), Rotana Records
 Waylak Min Allah (2010), Rotana Records

Songs
2000: "Halan"
2002: "Zaman"
2002: "Weyli Wah" Ft. Omar and Rafi
2004: "Mistanie Eiy"
2005: "Bedawwar a Albi"
2005: "Jnoon Bihobak" with Rayan
2005: "Ba'ad Sneen"
2006: "Baya al Ward"
2007: "Baheb Nuoa Kalamak"
2007: "Nefsy Tefhamny"
2008: "Khalina Ne'oul" Ft. Iwan
2008: "Ahla Ma Fel Eyyam"
2009: "Deq El Mayy"
2009: "Alby Nadak"
2009: "Keef El Amar"
2010: "Waylak Min Allah"
2012: "B3younak Za3al"
2012: "Be3amelni"
2013: "Fen El Dameer"
2015: "El Layli"

References

1977 births
Lebanese anti-war activists
Lebanese female models
21st-century Lebanese women singers
Lebanese philanthropists
Lebanese film actresses
Lebanese television actresses
Living people
Rotana Records artists
Lebanese Muslims
Musicians from Beirut